Narodna Volya ('People's Will') was a Ukrainian-language weekly newspaper published from Scranton, United States. As of the early 1960s, Matthew Stachiw was the editor of the newspaper. The newspaper had a circulation of around 8,000 at the time. Politically, Narodna Volya was close to the Ukrainian Socialist Party in exile.

References

Ukrainian-language newspapers published in the United States
Socialist newspapers
Newspapers published in Pennsylvania
Ukrainian-American culture in Pennsylvania
Non-English-language newspapers published in Pennsylvania